An aftershow or after-show is a genre of television talk show whose topic is another television program. An aftershow is typically broadcast immediately after a new episode of its corresponding program to help retain the audience, and to provide additional discussion and content related to the program (such as analysis and behind-the-scenes material). Aftershows may also include guest appearances by a show's staff or cast, and emphasize viewer contributions.

Format
An aftershow's typical format, pioneered by Howard Stern's The Wrap-Up Show on Sirius Satellite Radio in 2006, is two or more people discussing a just-aired episode. This is sometimes accompanied by bonus material from the series, or special guests such as actors or creative staff. TV channels see aftershows as a cheap way to provide more content for avid fans of popular series, as a venue for interacting with fans directly, and to help provide additional context and analysis to the series' narrative and themes. Aftershows can also help a channel retain viewers after an episode airs.

History
MTV Canada's The After Show was cited by the Toronto Star as an early predecessor to the aftershow format adopted in North America. The show was produced to accompany its airings of MTV's Laguna Beach, due to CRTC licensing requirements regarding the provision of Canadian content and a quota of talk show programming by the channel (the latter stemming from the service's early history in a previous format, TalkTV). The show gained a steady following: MTV Canada began producing the show in front of a studio audience for the Laguna Beach finale, resulting in "thousands" of fans lining up outside of the channel's Toronto studio for a chance to attend. The format was extended to its sister series The Hills, and was later picked up to air on the U.S. MTV channel as well.

Following the example of Talking Dead, U.S. entertainment channels began to add aftershows to their most popular scripted series in the 2010s. Embassy Row—the Sony Pictures Television-owned studio who produces Talking Dead, would be commissioned by other networks for their some of their own aftershows, such as Shark After Dark Live (which it produced for Discovery's Shark Week event). The New York Post wrote of the format having achieved a "saturation point" in 2016. In 2012, Maria Menounos launched AfterBuzz TV, a network of post-show podcasts devoted to various television series.

Some reality series have produced similar companion programs, usually with a focus on behind the scenes material, and interviews with eliminated and former contestants. Some of these examples, including American Idol Extra, Britain's Got More Talent, Strictly Come Dancing: It Takes Two, and The Xtra Factor. aired on a sister channel to the network that carried the main program (such as BBC Two, ITV2, and the Fox Reality Channel). For its former coverage of the Indian Premier League in cricket, Sony Pictures Networks aired Extraaa Innings T20—which combined the aftershow concept with elements of a traditional sports post-game show by featuring both match analysis, and entertainment segments such as celebrity interviews.

Notable aftershows

Parodies
In 2015, when CBS aired reruns of its primetime dramas to fill the timeslot of  Late Show with David Letterman until the premiere of The Late Show with Stephen Colbert, The Late Late Show with James Corden satirized the format with cold open sketches depicting aftershows such as Talking Mentalist and Talking Hawaii Five-0. One sketch also featured a metaparody, Talking Talking Mentalist—an aftershow for Talking Mentalist hosted by Corden's bandleader Reggie Watts.

The 2019 Fox comedy What Just Happened??! with Fred Savage is framed as an aftershow for an in-universe drama series entitled The Flare. Its season (and ultimately, series) finale featured Savage's character dealing with the cancellation of The Flare, and having to use his show to promote the in-universe teen drama Havenbrook.

References

 
 Aftershows
Television terminology